Immanuel Mulunga is a managing director of National Petroleum Corporation of Namibia (NAMCOR).

Early life and education 
Mulunga was born in Namibia. He holds a Bachelor of Science Degree from the University of Namibia. He then obtained a master's degree in Business Administration (MBA) from the University of Stellenbosch Business School in South Africa.

Career 
Mulunga started his career at NAMCOR from 2015 where he served as a managing director of NAMCOR, he served as the Petroleum Commissioner in the Ministry of Mines and Energy. From 2015 to 2010, he was the Ministry of Mines and Energy.

References 

Living people
Namibian business executives
Businesspeople in the oil industry
University of Namibia alumni
Stellenbosch University alumni
Year of birth missing (living people)